Cuba–North Korea relations are the bilateral relations between Cuba and North Korea.

Cuba has had diplomatic relations with North Korea since 29 August 1960. Cuba maintains an embassy in Pyongyang and North Korea maintains an embassy in Havana.

History
Cuba has been one of North Korea's most consistent allies. North Korean media portrays Cubans as comrades in the common cause of socialism. During the Cold War, North Korea and Cuba forged a bond of solidarity based on their militant positions opposing American power.

Che Guevara, then a Cuban government minister, visited North Korea in 1960 and proclaimed it a model for Cuba to follow. In 1968, Raúl Castro stated their views were "completely identical on everything". Cuban leader Fidel Castro visited in 1986. Cuba was one of the few countries that showed solidarity with North Korea by boycotting the Seoul Olympics in 1988.

Fidel Castro wrote that in the 1980s Kim Il-sung, "a veteran and irreproachable combatant, sent us 100,000 AK-47 rifles and its corresponding ammo without charging a cent".

In 2013, a North Korean ship, the  Chong Chon Gang, was searched by the Panama Canal Authority while traveling through the Panama Canal and found to be carrying weapons from Cuba, apparently to be repaired in North Korea and returned. The ship was later handed back to the North Korean government.

In January 2016, North Korea and Cuba established a barter trade system. Also in 2016, the Workers' Party of Korea and the Communist Party of Cuba met to discuss strengthening ties. After Fidel Castro's death in 2016, the North Korean government declared a three-day mourning period and sent an official delegation to his funeral. North Korean leader Kim Jong-un visited the Cuban embassy in Pyongyang to pay his respects.

In 2018, the new Cuban President Miguel Diaz-Canel visited North Korea, stressing socialist solidarity and opposition to sanctions. For his birthday in 2021 Kim Jong Un sent Diaz-Canel a floral basket via the country's ambassador.

See also

 Foreign relations of Cuba
 Foreign relations of North Korea

References

Further reading

 

 
Bilateral relations of North Korea
Korea, North